Tappeh Sangar is a village in the East Azerbaijan Province of Iran.

References

Tageo

Populated places in Ardabil Province